The following is a complete Jane Fonda filmography.  An American actress, writer and former fashion model and fitness guru, Fonda has won two Academy Awards, for Klute (1971) and Coming Home (1978).

Her early roles included the western comedy Cat Ballou (1965), the romantic comedy Barefoot in the Park (1967), the science fiction film Barbarella (1968), and the psychological drama They Shoot Horses, Don't They? (1969) for which Fonda received her first Academy Award nomination. In 1971 Fonda starred in the Alan J. Pakula thriller Klute portraying a prostitute, a role which won her the Academy Award for Best Actress. In 1977 she showed her range starring in the broad comedy Fun with Dick and Jane, and the Holocaust drama Julia. The following year she starred in Hal Ashby's Vietnam war drama Coming Home (1978) opposite Jon Voight. She received her second Academy Award for Best Actress. 

Fonda continued acting in films such as California Suite (1978), The China Syndrome, and The Electric Horseman (both 1979). In 1980, Fonda starred in the smash hit comedy 9 to 5 alongside Lily Tomlin and Dolly Parton. The satirical film revolves around three working women dealing with sexual harassment and discrimination in the workplace. The following year Fonda starred and produced On Golden Pond (1980). Fonda appeared with father Henry Fonda and Katharine Hepburn in the film. She continued to appear in the drama's Agnes of God (1985), The Morning After (1986), and Stanley and Iris (1990). 

After a 15 year absence from the screen she starred in the romantic comedy Monster-in-Law (2005), a commercial success which rejuvenated her acting career. She acted in the comedies Georgia Rule (2007), Peace, Love & Misunderstanding (2012), and This Is Where I Leave You (2015). She portrayed Nancy Reagan in the Lee Daniel's civil rights drama The Butler (2013). She also starred in Youth (2015), Our Souls at Night (2017), and Book Club (2018). 

In 1984 she won the Primetime Emmy Award for Outstanding Lead Actress in a Limited or Anthology Series or Movie for the ABC television movie The Dollmaker. Fonda also became known for her roles on television including portraying Leona Lansing in Aaron Sorkin's HBO political drama series The Newsroom (2013–2015). She received two Primetime Emmy Award for Outstanding Guest Actress in a Drama Series nominations for her performance. She also reunited with Lily Tomlin, both starring in the Netflix comedy series Grace and Frankie (2015–2022). For her performance she received a Primetime Emmy Award for Outstanding Lead Actress in a Comedy Series nomination.

Film

Source: Turner Classic Movies and IMDB

Television

Documentaries

Exercise videos

References

External links 
 

Fonda, Jane
Fonda, Jane